The 2022 EuroLeague Playoffs, known as the 2022 Turkish Airlines EuroLeague Playoffs for sponsorship purposes, is the ongoing first postseason portion of the 2021–22 EuroLeague basketball competition. They began on 19 April 2022 and are scheduled to be played through 4 May 2022. The top eight finishers in the regular season qualified for the playoffs, which consists of four series of two teams each, played in a best-of-five format. The winners of each of the playoffs series will advance to the Final Four, which will determine the EuroLeague tournament for the 2021–22 season.

Turkish club Anadolu Efes will enter the playoffs as the defending league champion, after having won their playoffs series and final four matches during the previous season.

Qualified teams

Tiebreakers
When more than two teams are tied, the ranking will be established taking into account the victories obtained in the games played only among them. Should the tie persist among some, but not all, of the teams, the ranking of the teams still tied will be determined by again taking into account the victories in the games played only among them, and repeating this same procedure until the tie is entirely resolved.
If a tie persists, the ranking will be determined by the goal difference in favour and against in the games played only among the teams still tied.

Series
The first playoff series was determined on 6 April 2022, when Bayern Munich lost a match in Istanbul to the defending league champions Anadolu Efes. This result confirmed that they would finish the regular season in eighth place, and therefore would face the No. 1 seed in the playoffs, Barcelona. The result between Bayern and Anadolu Efes also secured the seventh-place spot for AS Monaco, who will make their first EuroLeague Playoffs appearance. The other five spots in the quarterfinals were determined on 13 April 2022, at the conclusion of match week 34, which was also the conclusion of the regular season.

The full schedule, with dates and times for the playoff games, was announced on 9 April 2022. Mediolanum Forum in Milan will host the playoffs' opening game, when Armani Exchange Milan plays Anadolu Efes on 19 April 2022 at 19:00 CEST, and two games will be played on each match day. The games will be played in a 2–2–1 series format, wherein the higher seed will host the first two games, the lower seed will host the third and fourth games, and the higher seed will return to host the fifth and final game of each series; the fourth and fifth games of each series will be played if necessary. The four series winners will advance to the 2022 EuroLeague Final Four, to be played in Belgrade on 19 and 21 May 2022.

|}

Barcelona vs. Bayern Munich

Real Madrid vs. Maccabi Tel Aviv

A|X Armani Exchange Milan vs. Anadolu Efes

Olympiacos vs. AS Monaco

References

External links
Official website

Playoffs
Euroleague Playoffs